The fourth season of Ikki Tousen, titled Ikki Tousen: Xtreme Xecutor, is an anime television series based on the manga by Yuji Shiozaki, published by Wani Books and serialized in the seinen manga magazine Comic GUM. A fourth season, titled , was announced. Produced by TNK and ARMS, the series is directed and written by Koichi Ohata, music by Yasuharu Takanashi, characters by Rin Shin and Junji Goto, and produced by Hiromasa Minami, Hisato Usui, Keisuke Kawai, Shinsaku Tanaka, and Takuro Hatakeyama. The series aired twelve episodes on AT-X between March 26 and June 11, 2010, with subsequent broadcasts on Chiba TV, TVK, TV Saitama, Tokyo MX, TV Aichi, and Sun Television. Xtreme Xecutor is licensed in North America by Funimation Entertainment, as with the first and third seasons.


Episode list

Home Media release

Japanese
Six DVD and Blu-ray volumes were released by Media Factory between June 25 and November 25, 2010. The DVD/BDs contains an original video animation called .

References

2010 Japanese television seasons
Ikki Tousen